"Mean" is a song written and recorded by American singer-songwriter Taylor Swift for her third studio album, Speak Now (2010). It was released to US country radio as the album's third single on March 13, 2011, by Big Machine Records. Produced by Nathan Chapman and Swift, "Mean" is a banjo-led country track with a production incorporating hand claps, fiddles, and multitracked vocals. Inspired by critics of Swift, the lyrics narrate a protagonist's self-awareness of her own shortcomings, efforts to overcome the criticism, and ridicule of a "mean" antagonist.

In reviews of Speak Now, many music critics noted "Mean" as the album's only country-music song congruent with Swift's self-identity as a country musician. Some praised the catchy production and lyrical detail, with some picking it as an album highlight; a few criticized the lyrics as short-sighted. Rolling Stone featured "Mean" in their 2014 list of the 100 Greatest Country Songs of All Time. At the 2012 Grammy Awards, "Mean" won Best Country Solo Performance and Best Country Song. In the U.S., the single peaked at numbers 11 on the Billboard Hot 100 and 2 on the Hot Country Songs chart, and was certified triple platinum by the Recording Industry Association of America (RIAA). It reached the top 10 on the Canadian Hot 100, and received certifications in Canada, Australia, and the U.K.

The song's music video was directed by Declan Whitebloom, who developed the concept with Swift. With themes of self-empowerment and anti-bullying, it was praised by some media for encouraging a positive attitude, but questioned by others because of its unclear narrative. The video received nominations at the Country Music Association Awards, the Academy of Country Music Awards, and the MTV Video Music Awards. Swift performed "Mean" live two awards shows—the 2011 Academy of Country Music Awards and the 2012 Grammy Awards. She included it in the set list of two of her world tours, the Speak Now World Tour (2011–2012) and the Red Tour (2013–2014).

Background and release
American singer-songwriter Taylor Swift began working on her third studio album, Speak Now (2010), two years prior to its release. According to Swift, the album is a collection of songs containing confessions she had wanted to but could not make to the people she had met in real life. She was inspired by her critics to write the track "Mean", explaining that although she acknowledged constructive criticism, she was bothered by critics who were "just ... mean. And there's a line that you cross when you just start to attack everything about a person". 

In an interview on 60 Minutes, Swift said that the inspiration came from a critic who chastised her after her performance at the 2010 Grammy Awards, where she sang off-key. Some media criticized Swift's live vocals as weak; The New York Times said it was refreshing to see a talented singer-songwriter like Swift "make the occasional flub". Remarking on the particular critic that inspired "Mean", Swift said, "The things that were said about me by this dude, just floored me and like leveled me. And ... I don't have thick skin."

As part of a three-week iTunes promotional countdown for Speak Now, "Mean" was released for download on October 19, 2010, as a promotional single. It was sent to US country radio on March 13, 2011, by Big Machine Records. Two exclusive packages were released to Swift's official online store. The first included a T-shirt, an individually numbered "Mean" CD single, and an autographed lithograph. This package is no longer available. The second package contained just the T-shirt and CD single. Only 2,500 copies of the CD single were made. The single was later included in another package that is exclusive to Taylor Swift's official store. The package includes the Target exclusive deluxe edition of Speak Now, a free pair of headphones, and the choice between either the "Sparks Fly", "The Story of Us", or the "Mean" CD single.

Music and lyrics

In publications' reviews, music critics noted "Mean" as Speak Now most country-leaning track. The banjo-led song uses instruments associated with country music including fiddle and mandolin. Its sparse country-music production consists of hand claps and multitracked vocals. Jon Caramanica in The New York Times commented that the "rootsy" production resembles bluegrass music. In AllMusic, Stephen Thomas Erlewine compared the song's production, which serves as a country-music flavor to the album, to the Dixie Chicks' music.

Music scholar James E. Perone commented that "Mean" is the only album track congruent with Swift's self-identity as a country musician, as opposed to Speak Now dominant mainstream pop and rock styles. Analyzing the song structure, Perone noted the instrumental sliding up a whole step in open fifths at the end of each refrain, and the whole-step slide up from the lowered-seventh scale-step to tonic, which evokes the Mixolydian mode typically found in Anglo-American folk music. According to Perone, the refrain uses a short melodic motive, which creates its catchiness.

The song's lyrics address those who question Swift's ability to sing. This is echoed by Jill Serjeant from Billboard, who wrote that "[the song] appears to take aim at critics who slammed Swift's shaky vocal performance at the 2010 Grammy Awards and at other live shows last year." In the verse, Swift accuses the critic of pointing out the flaws that she is self-aware of, which makes her walking "with [her] head down" and being "wounded". In the refrain, Swift promises her critic that she would someday become successful so that their words will no longer affect her. She proclaims that she will move to a "big old city" one day, which Perone noted as congruent with a recurring theme of poor people moving to big cities to escape poverty in Appalachian music. At one point, the lyrics reference the 2010 Grammy Awards incident where Swift sings about how her critic attacks her because, "I can't sing."

Ann Powers from the Los Angeles Times also agreed that "Mean" "smacks down critics who say she can't sing (I stand accused) by declaring that someday she'll be "livin' in a great big city" and they'll be drunk in some dive bar, bloviating into the void." Additionally, the song lyrics reflect the issue of bullying, which is evident in a review by  Matt Bjorke of Roughstock, who commented that "'Mean' is an interesting song in that it finds Taylor chewing out many people, particularly bullies. It's a song that really could become part of the anti-bullying campaigns for schools everywhere." The song's couplets, ("You with your switching sides and your wildfire lies and your humiliation / You have pointed out my flaws again, as if I don't already see them"), were ranked at number five out of ten best couplets from Speak Now sheet by Leah Greenblatt of Entertainment Weekly.

Critical reception
Mandi Bierly from Entertainment Weekly praised the production of the song, saying "[the song] is a nice touch: It brings a sincerity to her pain and lets you focus on the words, which do, near the end, turn cheeky (proving she handles it with a sense of humor)." Theon Weber from The Village Voice described the song as "huge and hugely compassionate, and fearless" and praised it for being "chipper and funny because the narrator is predicting escape from someone she dislikes: "Some day, I'll be living in a big ole city/And all you're ever gonna be is mean." 

Kevin Ritchie from Now picked it as the album's best song. In The A.V. Club, Steven Hyden considered "Mean", among tracks where Swift "[indulges] in such overt nastiness" confronting those who wronged her, one of the album's strongest. On the other hand, Jonathan Keefe from Slant Magazine criticized the song for its lyrical content, writing "instead of actually doing something to improve on her inability to find or hold pitch consistently, Swift has simply written a song about how it's 'mean' for people to point out that problem."

The song won awards at the 54th Grammy Awards for Best Country Song and Best Country Solo Performance. Rolling Stone ranked "Mean" at number 24 on their list of the 100 Greatest Country Songs of All Time, the highest ranking for a song released in the 21st century and only one of three to be released in 2010s after "Springsteen" and "Follow Your Arrow" performed by Eric Church and Kacey Musgraves, respectively. Taste of Country ranked "Mean" as the 15th best country song of the 2010s. The song featured on a 2019 list of the 100 best country songs of all time by The Tennessean.

Accolades

Commercial performance
After its digital release in October 2010, "Mean" debuted at number two on Billboard Hot Digital Songs chart. The song debuted on the Billboard Hot 100 chart dated October 30, 2010, at number 11 (which became its peak position), the highest chart entry of the week. This made Swift the first artist to have the Hot 100's highest debut in three consecutive weeks. Prior to "Mean", the Speak Now tracks "Back to December" and title track both claimed the week's highest Hot 100 entry. For the week ending November 6, 2010, it debuted at number 55 on Billboard Hot Country Songs chart, the highest debut of the week.

Upon its single release, "Mean" re-entered Billboard Hot 100 at number 90 and number 17 on Hot Country Songs. The week of May 14, 2011, Swift made a record when "Mean" jumped from number 12 to number nine on Hot Country Songs, becoming her thirteenth consecutive top ten hit on that chart. It made Swift one of two women (the other being Carrie Underwood) to begin her chart history with 13 consecutive top ten hits since the survey's 1944 launch. The song peaked at number two. The week of August 14, 2011, "Mean" became Swift's thirteenth song to sell more than one million copies, which is more than any other country artist in digital history. By the end of 2011, "Mean" sold 1.2 million digital copies in the U.S. The song was number 24 on the Billboard Year-end Country Songs chart for 2011. It was certified triple platinum by the RIAA in August 2014. As of July 2019, "Mean" had sold 2.5 million digital copies in the U.S., the best-selling Speak Now track.

Prior to the official release of the song as a single, digital sales accounted for "Mean"'s appearance on international charts. In Canada, the song entered and peaked at number 10. It also made an appearance in Australia at number 45 the week of November 7, 2010.

Music video

Background and release
The accompanying music video for "Mean" was directed by Declan Whitebloom. It was shot over a two-day period in Los Angeles, with the Orpheum Theatre serving as its backdrop. The concept of the video was developed by both Swift and Whitebloom, who praised Swift's commitment and involvement with the production of the music video. In an interview with MTV News, Whitebloom said that "Mean" is very personal to Swift because "it's about a critic who was a little too harsh on her". However, he added that people can relate to its message, saying "we all have similar stories in our life that hit similar emotional cues, and to open it up and make it broader about lots of people and situations .. makes it much more accessible." Whitebloom described the video as sketches that feature scenes from all different time periods, from vaudevillian scenes to scenes resembling O Brother, Where Art Thou?. He also stated that the video was inspired by Swift's performance at the 46th Annual Academy of Country Music Awards.

Actress Joey King is featured in the video. Prior to the release of the video, Jocelyn Vena of MTV predicted that the video of "Mean" would be "a honky-tonk-type performance video, in which [Swift] and her band have a little fun at someone's expense." The music video premiered on Country Music Television on May 6, 2011, at 22:00 EST (03:00 UTC). To date, the video has over 210 million views on YouTube since uploaded on May 14, 2011.

Synopsis
The video begins with a shot of the inside of an empty theater. As the song begins, the curtains open to reveal Swift, wearing a cream-colored dress and playing a banjo guitar. The stage lights are brightened and Swift is accompanied by her band. They are dressed in vintage-inspired clothing. The stage is set to look like the front yard of a farmhouse. Shots of Swift and her band are alternated with shots that tell several stories about people who are the victims of bullying. One is a boy who is pushed around by members of a football team for reading a fashion magazine. Another is a girl who is earning money for college by wearing a costume to promote a fast food restaurant. The video shows the girl's peers throwing food at her. One story features Swift herself, who is tied to railroad tracks by a villain. The villain then sits at a table and laughs and drinks wine with his friend. The final story is about a girl (played by Joey King) who is not allowed to sit with a group of other girls at lunchtime, because she is wearing a different colored ribbon around her waist than they are.

At the 3-minute mark, the stage that Swift and her band is on is transformed into a ritzy nightclub. Swift is now dressed in a sparkly flapper dress, and she is now performing in the big leagues. For the video's conclusion, each of the different stories resolve themselves, and they all end happily. It is revealed that the boy reading the fashion magazine is now a famous fashion designer, the fast food girl has saved up for college and is now a big-time executive, and Swift effortlessly removes the ropes binding her and walks away from the tracks once the villain and his friend have passed out from drinking heavily. The final scene shows the girl with the unique-colored ribbon sitting as the only audience member in the theater, watching and applauding as Swift finishes her performance.

Reception
The music video was met with mixed reviews from critics. Story Gilmore of Neon Limelight perceived the clip to be "adorable", while Amanda Lynne of Gather.com was not disappointed with the video and thought that Swift delivered once again. The Huffington Post said the video was effective at putting Swift alongside the underdogs and dreamers. Jocelyn Vena of MTV wrote that the video "is the latest entry in an avalanche of empowering clips, which we've seen from artists like Katy Perry ("Firework") and Pink ("Raise Your Glass")." Ashley Lasimone of Taste of Country complimented Swift's looks in the video. She concluded that "it's difficult to not feel as empowered as superstar Swift."

Kyle Anderson of Entertainment Weekly thought that the message in the music video was confusing, writing "is she really equating a professional critic questioning her ability to sing at an awards show to getting bullied because you're different?" Donna Kaufman of iVillage also felt the mixed messages in the video, stating "the video doesn't show Swift being bullied... Instead, she's a kind of savior to the outsider kids, who are all shallow stereotypes." Kyle Buchanan of New York magazine described the video as clichéd, didactic, self-impressed and studiously unrevealing. Drew Grant of Salon.com felt that the video tried to disseminate an anti-bullying message from "a person who has never been bullied by equating it with an evil vision of a fairytale." Sophie Schillaci of Zap2it noticed that the flaw in the video was the assumption that "mean ole' bullies just rot in their hometown," whereas in reality, plenty of successful people are simply mean.

The video's themes of self-empowerment and anti-bullying received positive feedback within the LGBTQ community, specifically with a scene where a young male character sitting in a locker room reading a fashion magazine is harassed by football players; at the end, the said character is seen presenting a runway fashion show with his designs of women's clothing. Adriane Brown also noted the song and video resonated with Swift's core audience of teenage girls.

Live performances

"Mean" was first performed at the 46th Annual Academy of Country Music Awards on April 3, 2011. In May 2011, Swift performed the song on The Ellen DeGeneres Show. Swift also performed the song live at the 54th Grammy Awards on February 12, 2012, changing the first line of one of the final choruses to "Someday, I'll be singin' this at the Grammys". She performed "Mean" as part of the set list during her Speak Now World Tour, and part of The Red Tour set list as well. Swift also performed it on selected dates on The 1989 World Tour in place of "You Are In Love"; and during her Reputation Stadium Tour as the surprise song for the first Dublin show.

Credits and personnel 
Credits adapted from Tidal.
 Taylor Swift – vocals, songwriter, producer, acoustic guitar
 Nathan Chapman – producer, acoustic guitar, piano, digital piano, banjo, bass guitar, electric guitar, mandolin, organ, synthesizer
 Bryan Sutton – acoustic guitar
 Amos Heller – bass guitar
 Tim Marks – bass guitar
 Tommy Sims – bass guitar
 John Gardner – drums
 Nick Buda – drums
 Shannon Forrest – drums
 Grant Mickelson – electric guitar
 Mike Meadows – electric guitar
 Paul Sidoti – electric guitar
 Rob Hajacos – fiddle
 Tim Lauer – piano, Hammond B3
 Al Wilson – percussion
 Eric Darken – percussion
 Smith Curry – steel guitar

Charts

Weekly charts

Year-end charts

Certifications

References

Sources
 

2010 songs
2011 singles
Taylor Swift songs
Songs written by Taylor Swift
Song recordings produced by Nathan Chapman (record producer)
Big Machine Records singles
Songs about bullying
Song recordings produced by Taylor Swift
LGBT-related songs
American country music songs